Sergio Bueno Rodríguez (born July 4, 1962) is a Mexican former professional footballer and manager.

Player
Sergio Bueno started his professional football career with Deportivo Neza in the 1983-84 tournament against Puebla FC where he came in as substitute in the 88th minute. He played with Coyotez Neza from 1983 to 1988 where he played 99 league matches and scored 3 goals. In 1988, he transferred to Atlante F.C. where he only played for one year before transferring to Querétaro F.C. where he was a key player. In 1991, he was sent on loan to Morelia where he played in 27 of the 38 matches before returning to Querétaro F.C. where he stayed until 1994. In 1995, he transferred to Veracruz where he spent most of the tournament as a substitute. In 1996, he signed with Celaya and spent most of the tournament on the bench mentoring  the young players. His last club was Puebla FC where he only played in 15 matches before announcing his retirement at the end of the tournament.

Personal life
Bueno's son, also named Sergio, is also a professional footballer.

Managerial statistics

References

External links

DT profile at Medio Tiempo

1962 births
Living people
Footballers from Colima
Mexican footballers
Coyotes Neza footballers
Atlante F.C. footballers
Querétaro F.C. footballers
Atlético Morelia players
C.D. Veracruz footballers
Club Celaya footballers
Club Puebla players
Mexican football managers
Santos Laguna managers
Chiapas F.C. managers
Atlas F.C. managers
Atlético Morelia managers
Club León managers
C.D. Veracruz managers
Club Necaxa managers
Club Puebla managers
San Luis F.C. managers
Querétaro F.C. managers
Cruz Azul managers
Atlante F.C. managers
Association football defenders